The following is a list of Australian films that have been, or will be, released in 2023.

Films

See also 
 2023 in Australia
 2023 in Australian television
 List of 2023 box office number-one films in Australia

References

External links

2023
Australian
 Films